Thallarcha partita is a moth of the subfamily Arctiinae first described by Francis Walker in 1869. It is found in the Australian states of New South Wales, Queensland and Victoria.

The wingspan is about 15 mm.

References

Lithosiini
Moths described in 1869